This is a list of earthquakes in Brazil. Only large earthquakes are included, unless they cause damage and/or casualties. Intensities is measured in the Mercalli intensity scale. Depths are given in kilometers.

List of earthquakes

References

Brazil
 
Earthquakes